Ion Diaconescu (25 August 1917 – 11 October 2011) was a Romanian anti-communist activist and politician. He was imprisoned as a political prisoner for seventeen years from 1947 to 1964 during Romania's Communist era. Diaconescu later became a leader of the Christian Democratic National Peasants' Party (PNȚCD).

Born in Boțești, Argeș County, Diaconescu began his political in 1936, when he joined the Peasants' Party (PNȚ) youth wing. The Communist Party took power in Romania in 1947 following World War II. Diaconescu was arrested in 1947, but survived his imprisonment at a Romanian gulag. Romanian authorities released him in 1964 after seventeen years in prison as party of an amnesty program for political prisoners.

Romanian dictator, President Nicolae Ceaușescu, and the Communist government fell in the Romanian Revolution of 1989. Diaconescu co-founded the Christian Democratic National Peasants' Party (PNȚCD) in 1989, just after the revolution.

Diaconescu served as the Speaker of the Chamber of Deputies, the lower house of the Romanian Parliament, from 1996 to 2000. In 2011, Diaconescu criticized his own Christian Democratic National Peasants' Party (PNȚCD), which has been plagued by in-fighting, saying that the party should be relaunched under the leadership of former Prime Minister, Victor Ciorbea.

Diaconescu died in Bucharest in 2011, at the age of 94. He had suffered from heart ailments during his later years. His burial took place in Bucharest at the Bellu cemetery. A moment of silence was held in the Parliament of Romania in his honor. He received praise from many Romania's politicians and activists. Former Romanian President Emil Constantinescu called Diaconescu, "a symbol of communist resistance in Romania and Eastern Europe, and a symbol of honesty and honor." Former Romanian Prime Minister Victor Ciorbea paid tribute to Diaconescu saying, "Ion Diaconescu understood that faith and principles are national treasures, and he didn’t betray these (values), enduring 17 years in communist prisons." One of Romania's best known political activists, Doina Cornea, also praised Diaconescu's life and career, "Today’s politicians only think about their own interests. ... That is why Romania is crawling along."

References 

1917 births
2011 deaths
Romanian dissidents
Romanian prisoners and detainees
Inmates of Aiud prison
Inmates of Râmnicu Sărat prison
Members of the Chamber of Deputies (Romania)
Presidents of the Chamber of Deputies (Romania)
National Peasants' Party politicians
20th-century Romanian politicians
People from Argeș County
Christian Democratic National Peasants' Party politicians